This is a list in alphabetical order of cricketers who have played for Nugegoda Sports and Welfare Club in first-class matches. Where there is an article, the link comes before the club career span, and the scorecard name (typically initials and surname) comes after. If no article is present, the scorecard name comes before the span.

B
 Basit Ali (2019–20) : Basit Ali
 G. G. P. C. Bandara (2022–23)
 Vikum Sanjaya (2020–21 to 2021–22) : J. R. M. V. S. Bandara
 K. M. C. Bandara (2022 to 2022–23)
 Asantha Basnayake (2019–20) : K. B. A. K. Basnayake
 M. L. R. Buddika (2022 to 2022–23)

C
 D. D. A. I. Chamara (2020–21)

D
 S. H. J. L. Dias (2019–20 to 2021–22)
 Chanuk Dilshan (2019–20) : H. R. C. Dilshan
 M. V. T. P. Dilshan (2022–23)
 G. P. S. Disanayaka (2020–21)
 D. M. B. S. Dissanayake (2022)

E
 N. A. T. D.  Ediriweera (2019–20)

F
 A. C. T. Fernando (2019–20)
 N. N. Fernando (2021–22 to 2022–23)
 P. N. P. Fernando (2019–20 to 2022–23)
 S. R. Fernando (2019–20)
 V. S. Fernando (2020–21)

G
 T. R. Gamage (2019–20)
 R. Gimhan (2022)
 Sameera Gunaratne (2019–20) : A. D. T. S. Gunaratne
 Rahul Gunasekera (2019–20 to 2022–23) : N. R. Gunasekera
 S. N. Gunasinghe (2021–22)
 Nimantha Gunasiri (2019–20) : E. B. N. K. Gunasiri

H
 Pramud Hettiwatte (2019/20-2020/21) : P. C. Hettiwatte
 D. P. B. H. Hirantha (2019/20)

I
 Imran Khan (2019–20) : Imran Khan
 K. Ishwara (2020–21)

J
 Jahangir Mirza (2019–20) : Jahangir Mirza
 Jalat Khan (2019–20) : Jalat Khan
 M. M. Jaleel (2020–21)
 J. A. L. H. Jayakody (2020–21 to 2021–22)
 D. M. Jayalath (2021–22)

K
 K. Kaila (2022–23)
 T. M. U. S. Karunaratne (2020–21)
 N. M. Kavikara (2020–21 to 2021–22)
 Khurram Shahzad (2019–20) : Khurram Shehzad
 M. K. D. V. Kulatunga (2020–21)

L
 M. Lakshan (2020–21)
 M. D. N. Lakshan (2020–21)
 A. Liyanaarachchi (2022 to 2022–23)
 S. N. Liyanage (2020–21)
 A. Liyanarachchi (2022)
 R. M. Liyanarachchi (2021–22 to 2022–23)

M
 Pathum Madusanka (2019–20 to 2022) : W. A. D. P. Madusanka
 Pasindu Madushan (2019–20) : M. A. P. Madushan
 K. N. M. Maligaspe (2020–21 to 2021–22)
 S. B. P. Mendis (2022 to 2022–23)

N
 S. Nanayakkare (2022 to 2022–23)

P
 D. W. Pathmanathan (2021–22)
 P. Pathum (2022)
 D. N. Peiris (2022)
 P. S. M. Peiris (2022 to 2022–23)
 H. E. Perera (2020–21)
 Matheesha Perera (2019–20 to 2020–21) : K. K. M. R. Perera
 K. P. Perera (2020–21 to 2022–23)
 M. V. D. Perera (2020–21)
 T. D. Polgampola (2022–23)
 L. Pramodya (2019–20)
 M. Premaratne (2021–22)
 S. D. P. A. Premaratne (2022 to 2022–23)
 W. G. H. N. Premaratne (2021–22)

Q
 Qaiser Ashraf (2019–20 to 2022–23) : Qaiser Ashraf

R
 Denuwan Rajakaruna (2019–20) : D. D. M. Rajakaruna
 S. S. Rajapaksa (2022–23)
 N. S. Ranga (2021–22)
 W. A. I. Rangana (2021–22)
 G. S. S. Rathnasuriya (2019–20)

S
 H. P. de Silva (2021–22 to 2022)
 M. M. S. K de Silva (2019–20)
 Irosh Samarasooriya (2019–20) : I. S. S. Samarasooriya
 R. S. Sayer (2021–22)
 S. M. M. Senaviratna (2019–20)
 Mohamed Shilmi (2019–20) : M. M. M. Shilmi
 Movin Subasingha (2019–20) : M. H. Subasingha
 Dulantha Sumathipala (2019–20) : D. Sumathipala

T
 M. S. Trunkwala (2022–23)

V
 V. Vats (2022)

W
 Poorna Wannithilake (2019–20) : K. M. S. P. Wannithilake
 C. Weeraratne (2019–20)
 L. L. Weerasekara (2022)
 Sehan Weerasinghe (2019–20) : K. P. S. A. M. Weerasinghe
 P. C. Wickramasinghe (2021–22)
 W. P. S. D. Wickramasinghe (2019–20)
 C. M. Withana (2022)

References

Nugegoda Sports and Welfare Club